Walker's Greyhounds was the popular name for a division of the Confederate States Army under Major-General John George Walker, composed exclusively of units from Texas. It fought in the Western Theater and the Trans-Mississippi Department, gaining its nickname because the men were able to move long distances rapidly on foot.

Organization
Walker's Greyhounds, also known as Walker's Texas Division, was mustered at Camp Nelson, Arkansas, in July 1862. It was placed under the command of Maj. Gen. John George Walker in November 1862, and remained under his command until the end of the war. The division served exclusively in the Trans-Mississippi Department. When General Walker was given a district command in late 1864 the division was given to Maj. Gen. John H. Forney.

Composition

1st Brigade
Col. Overton C. Young
Brig. Gen. James M. Hawes
Brig. Gen. Thomas N. Waul
Brig. Gen. Wilburn H. King
Col. Richard B. Hubbard

 12th Texas Infantry Regiment - Also known as Young's 8th Regiment.
 18th Texas Infantry Regiment - Transferred to the 4th Brigade in 1865.
 22nd Texas Infantry Regiment
 13th Texas Cavalry Regiment (Dismounted)
 29th Texas Cavalry Regiment (Dismounted) - Joined brigade in 1865.
 Halderman's Texas Battery

2nd Brigade
Brig. Gen. Horace Randal
Brig. Gen. Robert Plunket Maclay

 11th Texas Infantry Regiment
 14th Texas Infantry Regiment
 28th Texas Cavalry Regiment (Dismounted) - Transferred to the 4th Brigade in 1865.
 6th (Gould's) Texas Cavalry Battalion (Dismounted)
 Daniel's Texas Battery

3rd Brigade
Col. George M. Flournoy
Brig. Gen. Henry E. McCulloch
Brig. Gen. William R. Scurry
Brig. Gen. Richard Waterhouse

 16th Texas Infantry Regiment - Transferred to the 4th Brigade in 1865.
 17th Texas Infantry Regiment
 19th Texas Infantry Regiment
 16th Texas Cavalry Regiment (Dismounted) 
 2nd Texas Partisan Rangers Regiment - Joined brigade in 1865.
 3rd Texas Infantry Regiment - Served only during the Red River campaign.
 1st Texas Field Battery (Edgar's)

Original 4th Brigade

Brig. Gen. James Deshler

 10th Texas Infantry Regiment
 15th Texas Cavalry Regiment (Dismounted)
 18th Texas Cavalry Regiment (Dismounted)
 25th Texas Cavalry Regiment (Dismounted)

4th Brigade (1865)
Brig. Gen. Wilburn H. King

 16th Texas Infantry Regiment
 18th Texas Infantry Regiment
 28th Texas Cavalry Regiment (Dismounted)
 34th Texas Cavalry Regiment (Dismounted) 
 Wells' Texas Cavalry Regiment

Major engagements

Vicksburg Campaign

The Greyhounds fought at the Battle of Milliken's Bend and the Battle of Young's Point, incidental engagements of the Vicksburg Campaign, in June 1863. They remained in northern Louisiana for several months, and then returned to Arkansas in late 1863.

Red River Campaign
Sent from Arkansas to Louisiana again in April 1864, they served as part of Lt. Gen. Richard Taylor's Army at the significant Confederate victories at the Battle of Mansfield (April 8, 1864), and the Battle of Pleasant Hill (April 9, 1864), critical engagements in the Red River Campaign.

Camden Expedition
Rushed back to Arkansas by Tran-Mississippi Department Commander Edmund Kirby Smith, they fought at the Battle of Jenkins' Ferry on April 30, 1864, the last engagement of the Camden Expedition.

Mustered out

In March 1865, the division was ordered to Hempstead, Texas.  The division was awaiting the arrival of Confederate President Jefferson Davis in order to make the Last Stand of the Confederacy at Hempstead, Texas. Davis failed to arrive, and with the war over and the main Confederate armies having surrendered, approximately 8,000 CS Soldiers constituting the remnants of the much depleted division simply went home from Hempstead, Texas, in late May 1865.

See also
Texas Civil War Confederate Units

References

Bibliography
 Lowe, Richard G., Walker's Texas Division, Louisiana State University Press, 2004.

External links
 

Divisions of the Confederate States Army
Texas in the American Civil War
1862 establishments in Arkansas